Falvy is a commune in the Somme department in Hauts-de-France in northern France.

Geography

History
Falvy originated as a Gaulish village. Known by different names over the centuries :Fala, Falvicum in 1135, Phalevi in 1146, then Fallevy or Falevi sur Somme and finally Falvy
Principle events :
 In the 12th century, Raoul I de Nesle, seigneur of both Nesle and Falvy, gave the windmill of  Falvy-sur-Somme to the church at Saint-Quentin.
1629 and Louis XIII dismantles the château, a medieval fortress
 On 22 November 1916, fighter-ace-pilot Georges Guynemer claimed his 23rd victim at Falvy.
 On 9 August 1918, the bridge at Falvy was attacked by Lieutenant James Alfred Keating, an American volunteer in the RFC. He won the Distinguished Flying Cross.

Population

Places of interest
The church of Saint Benoite has dimensions that are relative to a time when the population was larger. Its origin was as a chapel to the chateau. It was victim of revolutionary vandalism in 1792, losing much of its embellishment and harmony by such destruction.
The lake

See also
Communes of the Somme department

References

Communes of Somme (department)